Tirigan (fl. late 3rd millennium BCE, ti-ri₂-ga-a-an) was the 19th and last Gutian ruler in Sumer mentioned on the "Sumerian King List" (SKL). According to the SKL: Tirigan was the successor of Si'um. Tirigan ruled for 40 days before being defeated by Utu-hengal of Uruk, c. 2050 BC.

Sumerian King List

According to the Sumerian King List:

Victory stele of Utu-hengal

Tirigan is mentioned extensively in the victory stele of his nemesis and successor, Utu-hengal (also known as Utu-Khegal and Utu-Hegal):

See also

 History of Sumer
 Sumerian King List
 List of Mesopotamian dynasties
 Chronology of the ancient Near East

References

21st-century BC Sumerian kings
Gutian dynasty of Sumer